Shah Mahalleh may refer to:
 Shah Mahalleh, Gilan
 Shah Mahalleh, Mazandaran